War Widows Association (WWA) is a registered non-governmental civilian organisation based in New Delhi for the support of women who have lost their husbands to war. The Association has reached out to and supported the widows of the 1965 Indo-Pakistani War, the 1971 Indo-Pak war, the Kargil War in 1999 as well as the widows of the CRPF men killed in Pulwama attack in 2019.

Description 
WWA was formed by women who were affected by the trauma of the 1965 Indo-Pakistani War to provide support to wives who had lost their husbands in the 1971 Indo-Pak war; this was the impetus for the formation of the War Widows Association in 1972 with its chairperson as V.Mohini Giri. The group found out that the main concerns of the widows after losing their husbands were "shelter, jobs and dignity". The widows also struggled with supporting their children. With these findings, the group approached Prime Minister Indira Gandhi who promised her support for the empowerment of the widows along with the construction of Shaheed Bhawan, Aruna Asaf Ali Marg for the usage of WWA. After the Kargil War, with almost no resources, WWA offered to provide housing and transport facilities for the families of the soldiers hospitalized in Delhi. Wing Commander N. K. Pant (Retd) explains that "the majority of the killed and wounded soldiers are in the age group of 23 to 25 years, and most of them have left behind young widows and infants". The organisations holds events on occasions like Vijay Diwas, the end of the Indo-Pakistan war of 1971.

Mission 
The following mission became its mandate:

See also 

 War Widows Association of Great Britain
 Army Wives Welfare Association, India

References 

Indian Army
Military-related organizations
Veterans' affairs in India
Organisations based in India
Widowhood in India
1972 establishments in Delhi
Organizations established in 1972
Women in Delhi